Sahm is a surname. Notable people with the surname include:

Claudia Sahm, American economist
Doug Sahm (1941–1999), American musician and singer-songwriter
Heinrich Sahm (1877–1939), German lawyer and politician
Shandon Sahm (born 1969), American drummer